Utah State Route 220 may refer to:
Utah State Route 220 (1941-1957)
Utah State Route 220 (1966-1990)